Whelpley is a surname. Notable people with the surname include:

 Edward W. Whelpley (1818–1864), Chief Justice of New Jersey
 James Davenport Whelpley (1817–1872), Presbyterian minister
 Samuel Whelpley (1766–1817), Presbyterian minister